Yachmenev is a surname. Notable people with the surname include:

Aleksey Yachmenev (1866–1937), Native American chief
Denis Yachmenev (born 1984), Russian ice hockey player, brother of Vitali
Vitali Yachmenev (born 1975), Russian ice hockey player

Russian-language surnames